Antillotyphlops monensis, the Mona worm snake, is a harmless blind snake species is endemic to Mona Island in the West Indies. No subspecies are currently recognized.

Geographic range
Known only from the type locality, which is given as "Mona Island, West Indies."

References

External links
 

monensis
Reptiles described in 1926
Taxonomy articles created by Polbot